Talk

Jean-Baptiste Tuby II (1665 - 6 October 1735) was a French sculptor, son of Jean-Baptiste Tuby. He sculpted Christ entering Jerusalem for Orleans Cathedral in 1703.

References

External links
 Cathédrale de Chartres - Tour du chœur : Jean-Baptiste Tuby

18th-century French sculptors
1665 births
1735 deaths